Hešeri (Chinese: 赫舍里; Pinyin: Hesheli; Manchu:  Hešeri), is a clan of Manchu nobility with Jianzhou Jurchens roots, originally hailing from the area which is now the modern Chinese provinces of Jilin and Liaoning. It was once one of the most important and powerful noble families in the early Qing dynasty in China, second only to the royal House of Aisin Gioro, to whom they were closely related by marriage. 

The power of the Hešeri family reached its zenith in the period of Duke Hešeri Sonin and his third son Lord Hešeri Songgotu (from approximately 1650 to 1705). Although its influence declined following Songgotu's death, the Hešeri clan continued to be the hereditary nobility and play a role in Chinese politics until the demise of the Qing dynasty in early 1912.

History

Origins
The name Hešeri was first recorded in the Thirty Common Surnames of Jurchen during the later Tang dynasty (c. 800-850), and is said to be derived from the name of an ancestral river (šeri loosely translating to water-spring in the Manchu language). Alternatively, some have suggested that the name may stem from that of an ancient tribe. During the Tang dynasty, the Hešeri lived on the northern outskirts of the empire, co-existing to some degree with the then extant Khitan and the Liao dynasty they founded (which dynasty the Jurchen ultimately conquered and destroyed in 1125); while the bulk of the clan maintained their ancestral residencies, the (second) ascendancy of the Jurchen (renamed by this time to Manchu) during the Qing dynasty and the administrative and military appointments clan Hešeri enjoyed as a result saw moderate diffusion of Hešeri throughout the more interior northern and central provinces.

After the Xinhai Revolution of 1911 and the resulting 1912 collapse of the Qing dynasty, the vast majority of Hešeri saw fit to distance themselves from their Manchu origins. To accomplish this, the more Han-sounding diminutive He (Chinese: 赫 / 何) was adopted as a replacement surname (commonly spelled Ho in Hong Kong and several other Cantonese-speaking regions); a few Hešeri went further and changed their surnames completely to Gao (高), Kang (康), Zhang (张), Lu (芦), He (贺), Suo (索), Ying (英), Hao (郝), Hei (黑), Pu (普), Li (李), or Man (满).

Notable figures

Jin dynasty

In the 119-year history of the Jin dynasty, at least 52 people from this clan were powerful enough to affect the government's decisions. Their names were recorded in the History of Jin. 
Lihua, Empress Qinxian
Zhining, Prince Jinyuan of the Second Rank.
Liangbi, Prince Jinyuan of the Second Rank .
Ziren.
Cupei.
Machan, Cupei's brother.
Zhizhong (?-1213).
Yawuta (?-1231), a general.

Qing dynasty

Males
Šose, Sonin's father. Fluent in Mandarin, Mongolian and Manchu. Awarded the honorific Baksi ("Knowledgeable Man", Chinese: 巴克什 Bākèshí) by the Qing dynasty's founding father, Nurhaci.
Sonin (?-1667), Duke of the First Rank, Chief minister, Grand Councillor of the Shunzhi Emperor. Senior among the Four Regents of the Kangxi Emperor; 
Gabula (?-1681), first son of Sonin, Duke of the First Rank. Father in law and Chief Minister of the Kangxi Emperor.
Songgotu (?-1703), third son of Sonin, Grand Councillor, Baohe Scholar Chief Minister of the Kangxi Emperor, main signatory of the Treaty of Nerchinsk.
Xinyu (Chinese: 心裕), fifth son of Sonin, Earl of the First Rank. 
Fabao (Chinese: 法保), sixth son of Sonin, inherited the Duke of the First Rank from his father. 
Hife (?-1662), Šose's brother. Viscount of the Third Rank. He had the same language skill as his elder brother. Also awarded the honorific Baksi and honored as one of only three companions to the then-emperor with the epithet "[one] whose merit aided our Way."
Suwayamboo (1641–1684), son of Hife, Sonin's cousin. Viscount of the Third Rank . Minister of River Transport for the Kangxi Emperor.
Sungseo (?-1755), grandson of Suwayamboo, Viscount of the First Rank, Co-minister of Rites.
Erdeni (Chinese: , not to be confused with Panchen Erdeni), originally from the Nara clan, one of the two inventors of the Manchu script. He was inducted into the clan and given the surname Hešeri by the Qing ruler Hong Taiji as a reward for his contributions.
Dingshou (?-1731), the General of Light Chariot of the Third Rank one of the greatest military generals of the early Qing dynasty. Ultimately served as Vice Governor of the Mongolian Plain Yellow Banner.
Songzhu (1657–1735), Grand Councillor, Minister of Rites(), Wenhua Scholar, Royal Tutor
Giyamo (1711-1777), Minister of River Transport, Minister of Home Office.
Guangliang (?-1800), General of Heilongjiang.
Fuzhina (?-1810), Viceroy (or more precisely Governor-General) of Guizhou.
Saicungga (?-1826), Baron of the Second Rank, Governor of the Mongolian Plain Yellow Banner. Served also as the Governor of the Manchu Plain Red Banner and the Mongolian Bordered Blue Banner prior to this appointment. Awarded the posthumous title 'Taizitaishi'.
Jirun (?-1826), Governor of the Manchu Plain Blue Banner, Minister of River Transport, Governor of Shandong, Co-Minister of Works.
Fulehungga (?-1829), Baron of the First Rank,内阁学士, Co-Minister of Wars, Co-Minister of Foreign Affairs
Nadanju (?-1832), Minister of Rites, Co-Minister of Wars.
Shutong'a (1776–1836), Vice Military Conmmander of Zhili.
Chunqing (?-1847), Viceroy of Yunnan and Guizhou.
Mutengge (1780–1852), General of Jiangnin.
Šuhingga (?-1858), Viceroy of Shanxi and Gansu, Co-Minister of Wars, 軍機大臣, dead as 雲南巡撫.
Shuyuan (?-1859), Supreme Court Shaoqing, 盛京戶部侍郎兼奉天府府尹, 戶部右侍郎兼管錢法堂事務.
Hebao, 兵部员外郎, 通政司参议.
Yinggui (?-1879), Viceroy of Fujian and Zhejiang, General of the Army. Gained title 太子太保 after his death.
Warda, a general.
Tundali (Chinese:), an important military commander.
Hechun (?-1860), Viceroy and Imperial Admiral of Jiangnan and military commander.
Encang, a military commander.
Rushan, Magistrate of Sichuan.
Sebjengge (?-1907), General of Ningxia

 Prince Consort

Females
Imperial Consort
 Empress
 Empress Xiaochengren (1654–1674), the Kangxi Emperor's first empress, the mother of Chenghu (1670–1672) and Yunreng (1674–1725)

 Imperial Noble Consort
 Imperial Noble Consort Xianzhe (1856–1932), the Tongzhi Emperor's consort

 Consort
 Consort Ping (d. 1696), the Kangxi Emperor's consort, the mother of Yinji (1691)
 Consort Chang (1808–1860), the Daoguang Emperor's noble lady

 Imperial Concubine
 Imperial Concubine Xi (d. 1702), the Kangxi Emperor's imperial concubine

 Second Class Female Attendant
 Second Class Female Attendant Mu (d. 1832), the Daoguang Emperor's second class female attendant

Princess Consort
 Primary Consort
 Yun'e's second primary consort

 Secondary Consort
 Mianyu's secondary consort (d. 1860)
 Yicong's secondary consort, the mother of Zailian (1854–1917), Zaiyi (1856–1923), fifth daughter (b. 1857), Zaiying (1859–1930) and Zaisheng (1860–1864)

Modern Era
Ying Lianzhi (Chinese:英斂之; 1867–1926), also known as Ying Hua (英华), founder of the prominent newspaper Ta Kung Pao, and founding member of The Catholic University of Peking.

Gallery

See also
 List of Manchu clans

References

External links
THE CAMBRIDGE HISTORY OF CHINA The Qing Empire To 1800

Manchuria
Jurchen history
Qing dynasty people
Manchu clans
 
Plain Yellow Banner